The Peru men's national volleyball team is the national team of Peru. The squad won the bronze medal at the inaugural 1951 South American Championship in Rio de Janeiro, Brazil. Peru women is one of the dominant forces in the continent, however the dominant forces in men's volleyball on the South American continent are Brazil and Argentina.

Results

World Championship
 1960 — 14th place

South American Championship
 1951 —  Bronze Medal
 1956 — 4th place
 1958 — did not compete
 1961 — 4th place
 1962 — 7th place
 1964 — did not compete
 1967 — did not compete
 1969 — did not compete
 1971 — 6th place
 1973 — did not compete
 1975 — did not compete
 1977 — 4th place
 1979 — 6th place
 1981 — did not compete
 1983 — did not compete
 1985 — 6th place
 1987 — 7th place
 1989 — 4th place
 1991 — 4th place
 1993 — did not compete
 1995 — 6th place
 1997 — 4th place
 1999 — 8th place
 2001 — did not compete
 2003 — did not compete
 2005 — did not compete
 2007 — 8th place
 2009 — 6th place
 2011 — did not compete
 2013 — did not compete
 2015 — 7th place
 2017 — 7th place
 2019 — 5th place
 2021 — 5th place

References
Sports123
Confederación Sudamericana de Voleibol – Historical Ranking

Volleyball
National men's volleyball teams
Men's sport in Peru
Volleyball in Peru